Power finesse ratio or PFR in baseball is a statistical measure of the performance of a pitcher used in Sabermetrics. It is the sum of strikeouts and walks divided by innings pitched. The alternative to a strikeout or a walk is either a hit or an action by a fielder (that is, the batter "puts the ball in play"), so it is an estimate of the number of times that the pitcher, rather than the batter or fielder(s), determines the outcome of the at-bat.

References

ESPN MLB Statistics Glossary

Pitching statistics